The Scarborough Stakes, registered as the Champagne Stakes, is a Moonee Valley Racing Club Group 3 Thoroughbred horse race for three-year-old fillies, under set weight conditions, over a distance of 1200 metres, held annually at Moonee Valley Racecourse, Melbourne, Australia in September. Total prize money for the race is A$200,000.

History

Distance
1975 onwards - 1200 metres with exceptions
1987–1988 - 1212 metres
1994–1995 - 1206 metres

Grade
1975–1978 - Principal Race
1979–1984 - Group 3
1985–2004 - Group 2
2005 onwards  -  Group 3

Name
1975–1978 - Moonee Valley Champagne Stakes
1979–1984 - Leilani Stakes
1985–1986 - Veuve Cliquot Classic
1987–1989 - The Veuve Cliquot
1990–1993 - The Laurent Perrier
1994 - Moet & Chandon Stakes
1995–2002 - Champagne Stakes
2003 - Club Lifestyle Stakes
2004 - Mitsubishi Stakes
2005–2015 - Champagne Stakes
2016 onwards - Scarborough Stakes

Venue
 1995 - Held at Caulfield Racecourse

Winners

 2021 - Seradess 
 2020 - Swats That 
 2019 - Loving Gaby 
 2018 - Meryl 
 2017 - Houtzen 
 2016 - Selenia 
 2015 - Take Pride
 2014 - Eloping
 2013 - Thump
 2012 - Snitzerland
 2011 - Miss Stellabelle
 2010 - Lone Rock
 2009 - Avenue
 2008 - Dan Baroness
 2007 - Antarctic Miss
 2006 - Estelle Collection
 2005 - Virage De Fortune
 2004 - Truly Wicked
 2003 - Dilly Dally
 2002 - Before Too Long
 2001 - Fair Embrace
 2000 - Ateates
 1999 - I Am A Ripper
 1998 - St. Clemens Belle
 1997 - Adeewin
 1996 - Always Divine
 1995 - Bracken Bank
 1994 - Love Of Mary
 1993 - Kapchat
 1992 - Klokka
 1991 - Royal Accord
 1990 - With Me
 1989 - Courtza
 1988 - Startling Lass
 1987 - Midnight Fever
 1986 - Society Bay
 1985 - Canny Lass
 1984 - Sauna
 1983 - Look Aloft
 1982 - Belle Stani
 1981 - Darling Take Care
 1980 - Heart Strings
 1979 - Lady’s Slipper
 1978 - Red Coral
 1977 - Proceed
 1976 - Vivarchi
 1975 - Miss Ollie

See also
 List of Australian Group races
 Group races

References

Horse races in Australia